Steve Odland  is an American businessman. He is the President and CEO of The Conference Board. He also is the former Chairman and CEO of Office Depot, Inc. and AutoZone, Inc., and the former President and CEO of Tops Markets and the Committee for Economic Development.

Biography

Early life
Steve was a graduate of Mullen High School in Denver, Colorado.
He received his Bachelor’s of Business Administration from The University of Notre Dame, and a Master's of Management degree from the Kellogg School of Management at Northwestern University.

Career
Since June 2018 Odland has been President and CEO of The Conference Board. The non-profit business membership and research organization counts over 1,000 public and private corporations and other organizations as members, encompassing 60 countries. It convenes conferences and peer-learning groups, conducts economic and business management research, and publishes several widely tracked economic indicators. The organization's five core centers are Economy, Strategy & Finance; Public Policy/Committee for Economic Development; Marketing & Communications; Human Capital; and Environmental, Social & Governance (ESG). Notable research and economic indicator data include US Consumer Confidence; Global Consumer Confidence; CEO Confidence; Help Wanted OnLine; Job Satisfaction; surveys of the C-Suite's top priorities for the year ahead; trends in CEO succession and boardroom diversity; and the leading economic and educational issues relating to public policy. He is the host of the organization's twice-monthly podcast, CEO Perspectives, which features thought leaders discussing an array of topics relevant to business executives. 

From 2013 to June 2018 he was President and CEO of the Committee for Economic Development, a non-partisan, business-led public policy organization that delivers well-researched analysis and reasoned solutions to the nation’s most critical issues.

In 2017, in collaboration with Joseph Minarik, Senior Vice President and Director of Research at CED, Odland co-authored Sustaining Capitalism: Bipartisan Solutions to Restore Trust & Prosperity. The book lays out a clear plan for how business and policy leaders can generate prosperity for business and society now, all while making capitalism sustainable for generations to come. The book received coverage by, among other publications, Fortune, Yahoo! Finance, Bloomberg, and CNBC.

Steve began his career at the Quaker Oats Company. From 1981 to 1996 he progressed through various positions and divisions at Quaker including pet foods, Golden Grain, international foods, and cereals. From 1996-1998 he served as President of the Foodservice Division of Sara Lee Bakery. He subsequently became President and CEO of Tops Markets, a position he held until 2000.

From 2001-2005 Odland was President, Chairman, and CEO of AutoZone. At the end of his tenure, AutoZone had over $5.6B in net sales, and approximately 3,500 stores and 45,000 employees across the U.S. and Mexico. He established the first corporate governance guidelines at the company. To drive teamwork and accountability he enacted, among other initiatives, the “40-headed CEO,” in which every month the 40 most senior executives (hence the "40-headed CEO”) convened for a half a day to review the company’s operations, performance, and financials.

He was named top new CEO in 2002 by Bloomberg Markets Magazine.

From 2005-2010 Odland was Chairman and CEO of Office Depot. During his tenure he implemented award-winning environmental initiatives ranging from green products to green buildings and energy saving measures. His commitment to diversity, including at the top echelons of the company, resulted in several awards and other accolades. The National Association for Female Executives named Office Depot as one of the top 30 companies dedicated to the advancement of women executives; the Women’s Business Development Council named it the Florida Corporation of The Year; DiversityBusiness.com recognized the company as one of the top for multicultural business opportunities. Also, Office Depot’s Supply Chain Diversity team published a catalog to exclusively feature Historically Underutilized Businesses – a first for the industry and one of the few such efforts in all of retailing. In the aftermath of the 2010 earthquake in Haiti, the Office Depot Foundation donated $10,000 to Doctors Without Borders to provide medical supplies; it also donated $10,000 to Feed The Children.

He is the 2007 recipient of Florida Atlantic University’s Business Leader of the Year.

From 2011 to 2012 he taught as an Adjunct Professor in the graduate schools of business at Florida Atlantic University and Lynn University.

He is profiled in the books, Nobodies to Somebodies: How 100 Great Careers Got Their Start, and Leaders on Ethics: Real-world Perspectives on Today’s Business Challenges.

He currently is a Director of General Mills, Inc. He is a Senior Advisor at PJ SOLOMON, a Trustee of The Conference Board, and a member of the Council on Foreign Relations.

Odland is a Contributor to CNBC and a former Contributor to Forbes.

Odland is a former Director of Analogic Corporation. He also has been a member of the Business Roundtable and Chairman of its Corporate Governance Taskforce; a U.S. Presidential Appointee as commissioner on the National Surface Transportation Policy and Revenue Study Commission; a member of the Committee on Capital Markets Regulation; a U.S. Presidential Appointee on the President's Council on Service and Civic Participation; a member of the Advisory Council of the Institute for Corporate Ethics; a member of the Advisory Council of the University of Notre Dame Mendoza College of Business; Chairman of Memphis Tomorrow; and a member of the Florida Council of 100.

References

External links

1958 births
Living people
University of Notre Dame alumni
Kellogg School of Management alumni
American nonprofit chief executives
Florida Atlantic University faculty
Lynn University
American retail chief executives
Quaker Oats Company people